The 2012 Richmond Raiders season was the third season as a professional indoor football franchise and their first in the newly formed Professional Indoor Football League (PIFL). One of 6 teams competing in the PIFL for the 2012 season.

The team played their home games under head coach James Fuller at the Richmond Coliseum in Richmond, Virginia. The Raiders earned a 10-2 record, placing tied for 1st in the league, qualifying for the playoffs. They were defeated in PIFL Cup I, 56-60 by the Albany Panthers.

Schedule
Key:

Regular season
All start times are local to home team

Postseason

Roster

Division Standings

References

External links
 2012 stats

Richmond Raiders
Richmond Raiders
Richmond Raiders